The de Havilland DH.37 was a British three-seat sporting biplane of the 1920s designed and built by de Havilland for aviator Alan Samuel Butler.

Operational history
The first example was named Sylvia for the sister of Alan Samuel Butler. It flew extensively for five years before being converted to a single-seater and having its engine upgraded to a  A.D.C. Nimbus. It crashed in June 1927.

The second aircraft was sold to Australia, and was flown by the Controller of Civil Aviation. Sold to the Guinea Gold Company in New Guinea, it was the first aircraft flown in that country. After a forced landing at Wau aerodrome in December 1937 it was put out of commission.

Specifications (DH.37)

See also

References

Citations

Bibliography
 
 

1920s British civil utility aircraft
Racing aircraft
Biplanes
Single-engined tractor aircraft
DH.037
Aircraft first flown in 1922